Pouteria pallens is a species of plant in the family Sapotaceae. It is endemic to Brazil.

References

Flora of Brazil
pallens
Critically endangered plants
Taxonomy articles created by Polbot
Plants described in 1990